The Party for National Concord-Abasangirajambo (PACONA-Abasangirajambo) is a small political party in Burundi.

Political parties in Burundi